Tom Dana Cohen (born August 13, 1953), is an American media and cultural theorist, currently a professor at the University at Albany, State University of New York.  He has published books on film studies, comparative literature, theory, cultural studies, Alfred Hitchcock, and Paul de Man. Cohen has also published broadly on American authors and ideology, including Edgar Allan Poe, Walt Whitman, Mikhail Bakhtin, William Faulkner and pragmatism, as well as on Alfred Hitchcock, Greek philosophy and continental philosophy.

He is the editor (with Claire Colebrook) of the Critical Climate Change Book Series at Open Humanities Press and has lectured and taught  internationally, including in China and Fulbright sponsored work in Thailand. He has been awarded a Distinguished Visiting Professorship by Shanghai Municipality in Shanghai.

Biography
Cohen's education consists of a M.A. from the University of Chicago in Comparative Literature and a Ph.D. from Yale University in Comparative Literature. Thus Cohen’s work began in literary theory and cultural politics but he has then explored as a philosopher areas of critical theory, cinema studies, digital media and climate change.

Selected bibliography

Books 
 
 Reviewed in:

References

External links 
 Personal page: Tom Cohen College of Arts and Sciences, University of Albany, State University of New York

1953 births
Living people
University at Albany, SUNY faculty
Philosophers of art
20th-century American philosophers
21st-century American philosophers
20th-century American writers
21st-century American writers
Critical theorists
Poststructuralists